The Pine Bush Central School District was established in 1938 in Pine Bush, New York, United States, and spans all of the Town of Crawford and includes part of six other townships in Orange, Sullivan, and Ulster counties. For the 2021-2022 school year, the district approved a budget of $125.8 million and currently enrolls just under 5,000 students.  

The school district has been named as a defendant in a lawsuit filed in March 2012 by three families alleging inaction following accusations of antisemitism and the resultant creation of a hostile learning environment.

Schools 
The district has 7 schools.

 Pine Bush
 E. J. Russell Elementary School
 Pine Bush Elementary School
 Crispell Middle School
 Pine Bush High School
 Circleville:
 Circleville Elementary School
 Circleville Middle School
 Pakanasink Elementary School

Towns 
Orange County, New York
Town of Crawford
Town of Montgomery
Town of Mount Hope
Town of Wallkill
Sullivan County
Town of Mamakating
Ulster County
Town of Gardiner
Town of Shawangunk

Alleged antisemitism

On November 8, 2013, The New York Times ran a front-page story that detailed allegations of antisemitic bullying in the Pine Bush Central School District and a related lawsuit by the parents of three district students. There were students known to have a good relationship with the teachers and performed anti-semitic rituals almost every day after school. In an earlier Times article, Philip G. Steinberg, the district's superintendent from 2008 to 2013, who, as well as two other administrators named as defendants, is Jewish, described the lawsuit as a "money grab." In the days following the Times' coverage hundreds of people protested against "its portrayal of Pine Bush as a bigoted, biased community." The United States Attorney for the Southern District of New York issued a statement in support of the plaintiffs in January 2014. Following a five-month long state police investigation, the Orange County District Attorney's Office announced in September, 2014, that no criminal charges would be filed against any children and "the investigation revealed no evidence that any school official had engaged in any criminal conduct." On November 4, 2014, Federal District Court Judge Kenneth M. Karas, presiding in White Plains, NY, denied a defense motion to dismiss the case brought on behalf of three of the five children included in the complaint.

External links 
Pine Bush Central School District

References 

Shawangunk, New York
Education in Ulster County, New York
Education in Orange County, New York
School districts in New York (state)
1938 establishments in New York (state)
Education in Sullivan County, New York